The Jakarta Light Rail Transit (Jakarta LRT) (lit. "Jakarta Integrated Rail Line") is one of the light rail systems in Jakarta, the capital city of Indonesia. It is conceived and built by the Jakarta provincial government.

Jakarta LRT is operated by PT LRT Jakarta, a subsidiary of municipally-owned property and infrastructure company PT Jakarta Propertindo (Jakpro).

History

Background 
The proposed LRT system in Jakarta was initially conceived as an alternative to the suspended Jakarta Monorail construction project. The suspension of the monorail project was due to the objection of the Governor of Jakarta, Basuki Tjahaja Purnama, to the construction of the monorail depot above the Setiabudi Reservoir. This decision was made to avoid a recurrence of the 2013 Jakarta Flood incident that occurred due to the collapse of the Latuharhari Embankment. The monorail project was ultimately cancelled as the investors failed to meet the advanced requirements set by the Jakarta Provincial Government. Consequently, the LRT project became the priority, with Governor Basuki Tjahaja Purnama expressing his hope for greater consistency and fewer setbacks compared to the discontinued monorail project.

The plan for the construction of the Jakarta LRT refers to Presidential Regulation Number 99 of 2015 concerning the Acceleration of the Implementation of Public Transportation on the Special Capital Region of Jakarta Province. As part of the preparation for the 2018 Asian Games, the Jakarta LRT was designated as a complementary public transportation system, and to facilitate its construction, the Governor of Jakarta directly appointed PT Jakarta Propertindo and PT Pembangunan Jaya for the project.

Phase 1 

The groundbreaking of the Jakarta LRT was previously planned to be held in conjunction with the Greater Jakarta LRT groundbreaking in September 2015. The Jakarta LRT groundbreaking was held on 22 June 2016, coinciding with the 489th Anniversary of the City of Jakarta. In December 2016, PT Wijaya Karya was appointed as the contractor for the LRT construction project worth Rp5.29 trillion (US$338,581.69). The construction itself only started in early 2017 after the land preparation process had been completed.

The Jakarta LRT project seeks to address the issue of heavy traffic congestion on the city's roads. The rolling stock comes from Hyundai Rotem from South Korea which was first arrived from the Tanjung Priok Port on April 13, 2018. Each trainset consists of two cars and will be able to carry 270 to 278 passengers. There will be a total of 16 cars. Platform screen doors by ST Engineering Electronics will be installed at all stations. To build the site, BCA had disbursed 2.78 trillion rupiahs of their syndicated loans.

The completion target of the Jakarta LRT construction before the 2018 Asian Games was not met, resulting in the limited operation of the LRT during the competition as a trial run. The limited trial run was carried out starting August 15, 2018.

A full public trial run began on 11 June 2019 between Boulevard Utara and Velodrome stations, with free admission to registered ticket holders. Since commercial operation began in December 2019, the "flagging" system has seen falling ridership, with an average of 4,364 passengers per day.

Network

Southern Line

Operational 
 Phase 1 - Pegangsaan Dua - Velodrome, along 5.8 km

Planned 
 Phase 2B - Velodrome - Klender
 Phase 3B - Klender - Halim

Construction of Route 1 started on 22 June 2016. The first six kilometers of the route connecting the Kelapa Gading Depot to Velodrome Station was 29.61% complete by 26 June 2017. It was expected to be operational before the 2018 Asian Games. However, this did not happen as construction is not yet finished and the Indonesia Asian Games Organizing Committee (INASGOC) considered that buses would be more effective in transporting the athletes.

The test run for the LRT was initially scheduled for 10 August, however was delayed to 15 August 2018. Phase 1 was planned to begin operation in February, 2019. After several delays, the line opened for free public trial run from July to late November 2019. Commercial operations began on 1 December 2019.

Northern Line (Planned)

Future development 
As of 2022, the route of any future extensions remains in flux and construction has yet to start.  One proposed option is:
 Loop Line
 Phase 1 - Pengangsaan Dua - Velodrome 
 Phase 2A - Pegangsaan Dua - Jakarta International Stadium, along 7.5 km
 Phase 3A - Jakarta International Stadium - Rajawali
 Halim Line
Phase 2B - Velodrome - Klender
Phase 3B - Klender - Halim

Pembangunan Jaya LRT (LRT KPDBU) 
Apart from the North and South Line plans, the Jakarta Provincial Government is also planning the construction of the Pulogebang-Joglo LRT route for 3,215 km (1,998 mi). This line procurement is carried out under the Regional Government and Business Entity Cooperation scheme between the Jakarta Provincial Government and PT Pembangunan Jaya.

Ticket and fare 
LRT Jakarta begun collecting fares from 1 December 2019. On the entire system, passengers pay a flat fare of Rp 5.000.

LRT Jakarta accept both cash and cashless payment. Cash payment are accepted to pay single trip tickets. Passengers must deposit of Rp 15.000 in addition to journey fare, which could be refunded within 7 days after last tapping out at exit gate.

Cashless payment methods accepted are prepaid cards and electronic wallet. Prepaid cards accepted include e-money (Bank Mandiri), Flazz (Bank BCA), TapCash (Bank BNI), Brizzi (Bank BRI) Jakcard (Bank DKI), and Multi Trip Card (KAI Commuter). LRT Jakarta also accepts Jak Lingko-branded payment cards provided by Bank DKI, Bank Mandiri, Bank BRI, and Bank BNI. Fares are deducted from these prepaid cards upon exiting. From 3 August 2020, LRT Jakarta accepts payment from electronic wallet. To date it only accepts wallets provided by LinkAja. Passengers only need to scan QR code at the entry gate to pay directly from their LinkAja e-wallet.

See also

Greater Jakarta LRT
Jakarta MRT
Greater Jakarta Commuter Rail
Transport in Jakarta

References

External links
 Jakarta LRT Progress video per May 2018

 
Rapid transit in Indonesia
Transport in Jakarta
Rail infrastructure in Indonesia
Passenger rail transport in Indonesia
Railway companies of Indonesia
Regionally-owned companies of Indonesia
Railway lines opened in 2019
2019 establishments in Indonesia
Light rail in Indonesia
Standard gauge railways in Indonesia
750 V DC railway electrification